Gadar or Gaddar may refer to:
 Gadar River, in Iran
 Gadar: Ek Prem Katha, a 2001 Indian romantic drama film
 Gaddar (born 1949), Indian poet and activist
 Gaddar: The Traitor, 2015 Indian film
 Gaddar railway station, Pakistan

See also 
 Ghadar (disambiguation)
 Ghadar Party, an early twentieth century Sikh anti-colonial Indian revolutionary movement in the Western U.S. and Canada